Hull: Hell and Fire is an account of the arson investigations which led to the arrest of Bruce George Peter Lee.  It was written by Ronald Sagar, one of the police officers on the case.  The book was written in English and numbers 198 pages.  It was published by Highgate Publications.

References

  

1999 non-fiction books
Non-fiction books about serial killers
Arson in the United Kingdom
Works about arson